The Dadu Plateau, also known as Dadu Mountain or Dadushan, is a plateau that stretches across Taichung, Taiwan. It borders the Taichung Basin in the east and the seacoast of Taichung in the west, and lies between the Dajia River and the Dadu River. The plateau is long and narrow, with a length of about 20 km and a width of about 5 to 7 km. Its average elevation is about 151 m above sea level, with its highest peak at 310 m.

See also
 Dadu, Taichung
 Kingdom of Middag

Plateaus of Taiwan
Landforms of Taichung